Nucci is an Italian surname. Notable people with the surname include:

Avanzino Nucci (Citta di Castello, 1552–1629), Italian painter
Benedetto Nucci (Cagli, 1515–1587), Italian painter 
Carlo Alberto Nucci, Italian academic
Danny Nucci, American actor
Leo Nucci, Italian operatic tenor

See also
DiNucci

Italian-language surnames